The Ensemble l’Itinéraire is one of the main European ensembles dedicated to the performance of contemporary music, known in particular for its performances of spectral music works. Spectral music alters “timbres by assembling orchestral masses.” Based in Paris, the ensemble was founded in January 1973 by Michaël Lévinas, Tristan Murail, Hugues Dufourt, Gérard Grisey and Roger Tessier. Michael Levinas is the son of the philosopher Emmanuel Levinas. Many of the composers studied at IRCAM. Since its creation, it has collaborated with many composers and created hundreds of art pieces.

References

Bibliography
Badiou, Alain. Logics of Worlds. Trans. Alberto Toscano. London: Continuum, 2009.
Griffiths, Paul. Modern Music and After: Directions since 1945. Oxford: Oxford University Press, 1995.
Malka, Salomon. Emmanuel Levinas: His Life and Legacy. Trans. Michael Kigel & Sonja M. Embree. Pittsburgh: Duquesne University Press, 2006.

Notes

External links
 Official site
 Ensemble l’Itinéraire on Facebook
 “L’Itinéraire.” Le portail de la musique contemporaine.
 François Nicolas, “L’Itinéraire (1973—…),” Annex III of Les enjeux du concert de musique contemporaine, edited by F. Nicolas (Paris: CDMC).

Contemporary classical music ensembles